Dragovac may refer to:

 Dragovac, Bojnik, a village in Bojnik, Serbia
 Dragovac, Požarevac, a village in Požarevac, Serbia